The 6th Annual Bengal Film Journalists' Association Awards were held on 1943, honoring the best Indian cinema in 1942.

Main Awards

Best India Film 
 Apna Ghar
 Garmil
 Bondi
 Bharat Milap
 Saugandh
 Doctor
 Kunwara Baap
 Basant
 Shesh Uttar
 Lagan

Best Director 
 Shailajanand Mukherjee - Bondi
 Niren Lahiri - Garmil

Best Actor 
Jahar Ganguly - Bondi

Best Actress 
Kanan Devi - Shesh Uttar

Best Screenplay 
Shailajanand Mukherjee - Bondi

Hindi Film Section

Best Director 
Debaki Kumar Bose - Apna Ghar

Best Supporting Actor 
Chandra Mohan - Apna Ghar

Best Supporting Actress 
Durga Khote - Bharat Milap

Best Screenplay 
Debaki Kumar Bose - Apna Ghar

Foreign Film Section

Ten Best Film 
  - How Green Was My Valley
  - Fantasia
  - H. M. Pulham, Esq.
  - Ball of Fire
  - It Started With Eve
  - Suspicion
  - Two-Faced Woman
  - The Little Foxes
  - Pimpernel Smith
  - Reap The Wild Wind

References 

Bengal Film Journalists' Association Awards
1943 film awards
1943 in Indian cinema